Martin County is a county located in the U.S. state of Kentucky. As of the 2020 census, the population was 11,287. Its county seat is Inez. The county was founded in 1870 and is named for Congressman John Preston Martin. Warfield, Kentucky, is the only non-dry city in the county.

History

Martin County was formed in 1870, and named for congressman John Preston Martin. The county seat was initially located in Warfield, but was moved to Inez due to its more central location in the county.

The county has long been reliant on the coal industry. In 1964, President Lyndon Johnson visited Inez, where he announced the launch of the War on Poverty.

Administration
The current officials of Martin County
 County Judge/Executive: Lon Lafferty MD
 Magistrate District 1 : Cody Slone
 Constable District 1 :  Homer "Pickle" Mills
 Magistrate District 2 : Kermit Howell Constable District 2 :  Randy Lafferty  Magistrate District 3 : Tracy Spence Constable District 3 :  Alex Fannin  Magistrate District 4 : Junior Hunt Constable District 4 :  Bradford Preece  Magistrate District 5 : Ronald Workman Constable District 5 :  Mitchell Bowen  County Attorney: Melissa Fannin Phelps County Coroner: Chris Todd County Jailer: Bill Preece County Sheriff: John Kirk Property Valuation Administrator: Bobby Hale County Clerk: Susie Skyles 
 Circuit Court Clerk: Denise Gauze'''

Geography 
The county's eastern border is formed by the Tug Fork of the Big Sandy River.

Adjacent counties
 Lawrence County  (northwest)
 Wayne County, West Virginia (northeast)
 Mingo County, West Virginia (southeast)
 Pike County  (south)
 Floyd County  (southwest)
 Johnson County  (west)

Demographics 

As of the census of 2000, there were 12,578 people, 4,776 households, and 3,620 families residing in the county. The racial makeup of the county was 99.25% White, 0.03% Black or African American, 0.06% Native American, 0.07% Asian, 0.06% Pacific Islander, 0.01% from other races, and 0.52% from two or more races.  0.62% of the population were Hispanic or Latino of any race.

There were 4,776 households, out of which 39.20% had children under the age of 18 living with them, 59.50% were married couples living together, 12.50% had a female householder with no husband present, and 24.20% were non-families. 21.80% of all households were made up of individuals, and 8.30% had someone living alone who was 65 years of age or older.  The average household size was 2.62 and the average family size was 3.05.

In the county, the population was spread out, with 28.10% under the age of 18; 9.50% from 18 to 24; 29.30% from 25 to 44; 23.30% from 45 to 64,; and 9.70% who were 65 years of age or older.  The median age was 34 years. For every 100 females there were 98.00 males. For every 100 females age 18 and over, there were 92.10 males.

The median income for a household in the county was $18,279, and the median income for a family was $21,574. Males had a median income of $31,994 versus $18,011 for females. The per capita income for the county was $10,650.  About 33.30% of families and 37.00% of the population were below the poverty line, including 45.10% of those under age 18 and 26.90% of those age 65 or over.

Economy
The Federal Bureau of Prisons U.S. Penitentiary, Big Sandy is located in unincorporated Martin County, near Inez.

They are 3 industrial parks located in Martin County. They are the Honey Branch Industrial Park, The Calloway Industrial Park and the John Callahan Industrial Park

 Honey Branch Industrial Park is a industrial park that is ran by 4 different counties in the region. The major tenants are the Big Sandy Regional Airport. The Federal Bureau of Prisons U.S. Penitentiary, Big Sandy. Core Energy Corporation, Consolidated Pipe and Supply, Boxvayna, Appleatcha Apple Orchard, CZAR Coal and Offices for Booth Energy and subsidies

 Calloway Industrial Park is pretty much abandoned. There was a Dirt Race Track and a Machine Shop. Mostly just houses and 1 water tank

 John B Callahan Industrial Park is home to C&S Vaults and the Martin County Board of Education Transportation Garage and Maintenance Department.

Coal companies in Martin County
 Alliance Resource Partners

 Excel Coal Corporation

 Booth Energy

 CZAR Energy

Education
The Martin County School System operates public schools.
 Martin County High School
 Martin County Area Technology Center
 Martin County Middle School
 Eden Elementary School
 Inez Elementary School
 Warfield Elementary School
 Martin County Head Start

There is one private Christian school located in Martin County

 Sure Foundations Christian Academy

There is one Private Vocational School located in Martin County

 TEK Center

Communities

 Beauty
 Inez (county seat)
 Job
 Lovely
 Laura
 Pilgrim
 Tomahawk
 Warfield

See also

 Big Sandy Regional Airport
 Big Sandy Area Development District
 Dry counties
 Martin County Sludge Spill
 National Register of Historic Places listings in Martin County, Kentucky
 United States Penitentiary, Big Sandy

References

Further reading

External links
 The Kentucky Highlands Project
 Martin County Slurry Spill 
 Sandy Valley Transportation Services, Inc.

 
Kentucky counties
Counties of Appalachia
1870 establishments in Kentucky
Populated places established in 1870